Gerald John Boileau (January 15, 1900 – January 30, 1981) was a U.S. Representative from Wisconsin.

Born in Woodruff, Wisconsin, Boileau graduated from Minocqua High School and served in the United States Army, in France, during World War I. He enlisted as a private February 25, 1918 and was honorably discharged as a corporal on July 16, 1919. Boileau graduated from Marquette University Law School, in 1922, and was subsequently admitted to the bar.

He married Monica McKeon on August 25, 1925 in Superior, Wisconsin. They had two daughters, Nancy and Mary.

He returned to Marathon County and became district attorney in 1926, a position he held until his election to Congress in 1931. Boileau was first elected a Republican to the Seventy-second United States Congress as the representative of Wisconsin's 8th congressional district. For his next term he redistricted to Wisconsin's 7th district and was reelected to the Seventy-third Congress. He was then reelected to the Seventy-fourth and Seventy-fifth Congress but ran as a member of the Wisconsin Progressive Party still representing Wisconsin's 7th district. After his defeat for reelection in 1938, he returned to Wausau, Wisconsin to practice law. He soon after returned to public service as a circuit judge, a position he held from 1942 to 1970 when he retired. He died in Wausau on January 30, 1981. He was the last surviving man elected to Congress as a member of the Wisconsin Progressive Party.

References

External links
 

1900 births
1974 deaths
People from Woodruff, Wisconsin
Military personnel from Wisconsin
District attorneys in Wisconsin
Wisconsin state court judges
American expatriates in France
Marquette University Law School alumni
Wisconsin Progressives (1924)
Republican Party members of the United States House of Representatives from Wisconsin
Progressive Party (1924) members of the United States House of Representatives
20th-century American lawyers
20th-century American politicians
20th-century American judges
Politicians from Wausau, Wisconsin